Deinonychus is a Dutch doom metal band formed in 1992 by Marco Kehren. There is a close relationship between Deinonychus and the German band Bethlehem: Kehren provided vocals on S.U.I.Z.I.D., Reflektionen auf's Sterben and Profane Fetmilch Lenzt Elf Krank, while Bethlehem bassist and lyricist Jürgen Bartsch joined Deinonychus in 2005. The first three albums and the early demos released as After the Rain Falls...An Empty Sky Remains, feature Kehren on all instruments and vocals; 1999's Deinonychus added Cradle of Filth drummer William Sarginson, and 2002's Mournument  was recorded with a full band. The band announced that they disbanded in September 2008. 
Marco Kehren nowadays runs a martial industrial band by the name of Nihil Novi Sub Sole.

Deinonychus revived in 2016 with a new line up consisting of Marco Kehren (guitars, bass, vocals), Steve Wolz (drums) and Markus Stock (keyboards). The band has recorded a new album called Ode to Acts of Murder, Dystopia and Suicide released on My Kingdom Music worldwide in October 2017.

Discography

References

External links
 Official Facebook Profile
 BNR Metal Pages entry
 Metalstorm.ee
 Deinonychus Reverb Nation

Dutch doom metal musical groups
Musical groups established in 1992
Musical groups disestablished in 2008
Dutch musical trios
Musical groups from Limburg (Netherlands)
Brunssum